The respective total mintage of the Stuiver 1948 was: 25,000,000, struck in Utrecht by the Utrecht mint, mintmaster.

References

Coins of the Netherlands
Five-cent coins